Kosaburo, Kōsaburō or Kousaburou (written: 攻三郎, 恒三郎 or こうさぶろう in hiragana) is a masculine Japanese given name. Notable people with the name include:

, Japanese mathematician
, Japanese politician

Kosaburō or Kosaburou (written: 小三郎 or こさぶろう in hiragana) is a separate given name, though it may be romanized the same way. Notable people with the name include:

, Japanese anti-communist and activist

See also
Kōzaburō

Japanese masculine given names